Tzohar is a community settlement and regional center in southern Israel. Located in Hevel Eshkol, it falls under the jurisdiction of Eshkol Regional Council.

History
The settlement was founded in 1970 as a regional center for the villages in Hevel Eshkol. It was named after a son of Simeon mentioned in Genesis 46:10, as the neighbouring moshav Ohad was named after his brother, mentioned in the same Bible verse. In the 1990s it absorbed many immigrants from Ethiopia and the former Soviet Union, many of whom lived in mobile homes.

References

External links
Tzohar Negev Information Center

Community settlements
Ethiopian-Jewish culture in Israel
Populated places established in 1970
Gaza envelope
Populated places in Southern District (Israel)
1970 establishments in Israel
Russian-Jewish culture in Israel